Djambawa Marawili  (born 1953) is an Aboriginal Australian artist known for bark painting, wood sculpture, and printmaking.

Biography 
Marawili was born in 1953 in Baniyala in East Arnhem Land in the Northern Territory of Australia. He is the son of Wakuthi Marawili and Mulkun Wirrpanda. Marawili's mother, Mulkun Wirrpanda (known as Ms M Wirrpanda since her death) was one of the few women in the Yolngu community who is acknowledged as a leader due to her great knowledge of the Dhuji-Djapu clan, and her father is Dhakiyarr Wirrpanda who was a Yolngu leader. She is also an artist, painting on bark, memorial poles, and didgeridoos, and she also has skills in carving, weaving, and printmaking, which have been shown in exhibitions in Australia and Asia. Marawili is the husband of Liawaday Wirrpanda, who is also an artist herself, exhibiting with her mother, Galuma Maymuru. In the Madarrpa clan of the Yolngu, Marawili is a senior leader, facilitating and leading ceremonies.

In addition to leading ceremonies, he ensures the spiritual well-being of his people including members from other clans. Acting as an activist and administrator, Marawili serves to connect the Yolngu people and non-Aboriginal people, bringing awareness to the Aboriginal people and serving as a bridge between the two groups.

Career 
In the early 1980s, Marawili began painting, incorporating the idea of buwuyak (invisibility) in his works, which was an innovative change in the Yolngu art tradition. His paintings often show the Yathikpa ancestral story of the bay where Bäru turned into a crocodile from a human figure. With works that capture both innovation and tradition, Marawili has become one of the most significant artists from the Yolngu community. Because his works capture tradition and historical meanings, the paintings of Marawili are also used as a source of history and records, especially in the legal battle to protect the right of the Yolngu land.

His paintings that portray sacred traditional designs demonstrate the right and purpose to speak for and protect their sea and land. Because of this reason, this portrayal shown in the Saltwater: Yirrkala Bark Paintings of Sea Country exhibition played a significant role in the Blue Mud Bay sea rights case where Marawili arranged for the Sea Right claim to the Federal Court in 2004. Eventually, the case went up to the High Court, and they gave Yolngu the ownership of the intertidal zone, between high and low tide marks.

Other roles
Outside of his life as an artist, Marawili has served in many leadership roles to support and bring an awareness to the Indigenous community. Roles have included:
Arnhem Northern and Kimberley Artists (ANKA) Chairperson (1998– )
Buku-Larrnggay Mulka Chairperson at Yirrkala (1994-2000, 2016-2018), board member (2001-2016)
Laynhupuy Homelands Committee Chairperson (1995-1997, 2018)
Northern Land Council Councillor (1995-1997)
Nambara Homelands School Board Member
 Australia Council Aboriginal and Torres Strait Islander Board (2008-2009)
 YBE Enterprises Board Member
 Yipara-Laynhupuy Homelands CDEP supervisor
 Appointed member of the Prime Minister's Indigenous Advisory Council, in both its first (2013–2017) and second (2017– ) terms.

Recognition
Marawili has won numerous awards with his significant paintings. These include the National Aboriginal and Torres Strait Islander Art Award (NATSIAA) first in 1996, and then again in 2019 with Journey to America, a stringybark piece. Other roles and recognition of his work as an artist and a community leader include:

Australia Council, Aboriginal and Torres Strait Islander Arts Fellowship (2003)
General Division of the Order of Australia (2010)
Opened the Tarnanthi  Festival of Contemporary Aboriginal and Torres Strait Islander Art at the Art Gallery of South Australia in Adelaide (2019)
Lead curator for Madayin: Eight Decades of Aboriginal Bark Painting from Yirrkala, Australia, scheduled to tour North America from 2021, the first significant collection of bark painting to tour outside Australia.

Collections 
Marawili's work is represented in the following galleries and other institutions:
 Kelvingrove Art Gallery and Museum, Glasgow, Scotland
 Kluge-Ruhe Aboriginal Art Collection, University of Virginia, USA
President of India Art Collection
National Gallery of Australia, Canberra
National Gallery of Victoria, Melbourne
Art Gallery of Western Australia, Perth
National Maritime Museum, Sydney
Northern Territory Supreme Court, Darwin
Art Gallery of New South Wales, Sydney
 Holmes à Court Collection, Margaret River, WA
Queensland Art Gallery, Brisbane

Significant exhibitions 

Saltwater: Yirrkala Bark Paintings of Sear Country (1999-2001)
Buwayak-Invisibility in Annandale Galleries(2003) 
Source of Fire in Annandale Galleries (2005)
Asia Pacific Triennial of Contemporary Art in Queensland Art Gallery (2006-2007)
One sun, one moon in Art Gallery of New South Wales (2007)
Larrakitj (memorial poles) in Art Gallery of Western Australia (2009)
Australia in Royal Academy of Arts (2013)
Our Land in Art Gallery of New South Wales (2017)

References

Further reading 

Buku Larrnggay Mulka Centre. Saltwater: Paintings of Sea Country: the Recognition of Indigenous Sea Rights. Buku-Larrnggay Mulka Centre in Association with Jennifer Isaacs Publishing Pty Ltd, 2014.
Dettman, Carol. Saltwater: Yirrkala Bark Paintings of Sea Country: Recognising Indigenous Sea Rights. Buku-Larrngay Mulka Centre in Association with Jennifer Isaacs Pub., 1999.
Djambawa Marawili AM
Djambawa Marawili AM HARVEY ART PROJECTS.
“Djambawa Marawili AM: Where the Water Moves, Where It Rests” Kluge.
Marawili, Djambawa. Djambawa Marawili: Source of Fire 2003-2005. Annandale Galleries, 2005.

1953 births
Living people
Members of the Order of Australia
Indigenous Australian artists
Artists from the Northern Territory
20th-century Australian artists